Indian garden, Indian Garden, or Indian Gardens may refer to:

 Indian Gardens, Arizona, populated place in Oak Creek Canyon, Coconino County, Arizona, United States
 Havasupai Gardens, formerly Indian Garden, place on Bright Angel Trail, Grand Canyon, Coconino County, Arizona, United States
 :Category:Gardens in India, in particular
 Mughal garden, built by the Mughals
 List of botanical gardens in India

See also
 India Garden, Cleveland Cultural Gardens, Rockefeller Park, Cleveland, Ohio, United States